Black Mountain may refer to:

Places

Australia
 Black Mountain (Australian Capital Territory), a mountain in Canberra
 Black Mountain, New South Wales, a village in Armidale Regional Council, New South Wales
 Black Mountain, Queensland, a locality in the Shire of Noosa

Canada
 Black Mountain, one of two named summits forming the Cypress Mountain Ski Area in West Vancouver, British Columbia
 Black Mountain, a mountain near Horsefly Lake in the Cariboo region of the Central Interior of British Columbia
 Black Mountain, a summit west of the south end of Shuswap Lake in the Southern Interior of British Columbia
 Black Mountain, a mountain on the east side of Kelowna in the Okanagan Valley of British Columbia
 Dark Mountain, formerly known as Black Mountain, in the Cassiar Country of northern British Columbia
 Coquihalla Mountain, formerly known as Black Mountain, in the Yale Division Yale Land District of southwestern British Columbia

Montenegro
 Montenegro, literal translation of the country's name
 Nickname of its  national Basketball team

Pakistan
 Tor Ghar also known as Kala Dhaka, historically known as Black Mountain of Hazara
 The Black Mountain tribes

Slovakia
 Black Mountain, Slovakia, a mountain range in the Slovak Ore Mountains

Turkey
 Nur Mountains, historically known as the Black Mountain

United Kingdom
 Black Mountain (Belfast), a mountain beside Belfast, Northern Ireland
 Black Mountain (District Electoral Area)
 Black Mountain transmitting station, a transmitter on top of the mountain
 Black Mountain (hill), a 703-metre (2300') peak in the Black Mountains range, the only peak on the English-Welsh border
 Black Mountain (range), a mountain range in South and West Wales
 Black Mountain, County Antrim, a townland in County Antrim, Northern Ireland

United States
Listed alphabetically by state
Black Mountain (Alaska), a summit in Glacier Bay National Park
Black Mountain (Arizona), a peak in the Little Ajo Mountains
Black Mountain (Maricopa County, Arizona), a mountain
Black Mountain (Pima County, Arizona), a mountain
Black Mountain (Fresno County, California), a ridge
Black Mountain (Inyo and Fresno counties, California), on Sierra crest
Black Mountain (Kern County, California), a mountain in the El Paso Mountains, Mojave Desert
Black Mountain (Mono County, California), a summit in Hoover Wilderness
Black Mountain (San Benito County, California), a summit
Black Mountain Wilderness (San Bernardino County, California), a mesa and surrounding wilderness area in the Mojave Desert
Black Mountain (San Diego County, California), a summit
Black Mountain (near Los Altos, California), a summit on Monte Bello Ridge in the Santa Cruz Mountains
Black Mountain Ranch, San Diego, California, a community in San Diego city's northeast
Black Mountain Open Space Park, the community's city park
Black Mountain (Milpitas, California), in eastern Santa Clara County
Black Mountain (Marin County), a San Francisco Bay Area summit
Black Mountain and Little Black Mountain (Sonoma County), several San Francisco Bay Area summits
Black Mountain (Moffat County, Colorado), a mountain in Moffatt County
Black Mountain (Park County, Colorado), a mountain in Park County
Black Mountain (Georgia), a mountain in Dawson County
Black Mountain (Kentucky), highest point in the Commonwealth of Kentucky
Black Mountain of Maine, a ski area in Rumford, Maine
Black Mountain (Michigan), a large hill in Presque Isle County, Michigan
Black Mountain (Missouri), a summit in Madison County, Missouri
Black Mountain (Nevada), a mountain in southern Nevada
Black Mountain Ski Area (New Hampshire), a ski area in Jackson, New Hampshire
Black Mountain (Catron County, New Mexico), a mountain
Black Mountain (Hamilton County, New York), a mountain
Black Mountain (Washington County, New York), a mountain
Black Mountain, North Carolina, a town near Asheville, North Carolina
Black Mountain College (1933–1957), a school founded in 1933 in Black Mountain, North Carolina
Black Mountain poets, sometimes called projectivist poets, a group of mid-20th-century poets centered on Black Mountain College
Black Mountain (Oregon), a mountain in the Blue Mountains and one of the highest points in Oregon
Black Mountain (Washington), a summit in the Glacier Peak Wilderness
Black Mountain Conservation Area, a protected mountain in Dummerston, Vermont, abutting the West River
Black Mountain (West Virginia), a summit in Pocahontas County

Entertainment
Black Mountain (band), a Canadian psychedelic-rock band
Black Mountain (album), a 2005 debut rock album by the band
"Black Mountain Side", Jimmy Page guitar solo
Songs from Black Mountain, a 2006 album by the band Live
Black Mountain poets, a group of mid-20th-century American postmodern poets
The Black Mountain (novel), a 1954 Nero Wolfe mystery novel by Rex Stout
The Black Mountain (film), a 1994 Chinese film by Zhou Xiaowen

Other
Battle of the Black Mountain, a 1794 battle in Capmany, Catalonia, Spain
Black Mountain Monpa ('Olekha), an endangered Tibeto-Burman language of western Bhutan
Black Mountain College, a former private college in North Carolina (1933–1957)
Black Mountain: An Exploration in Community, 1972 book by Martin Duberman about the college

See also
 
 Black Mountains (disambiguation)
 Black Peak (disambiguation)
 Black Volcano, an inactive volcano near Albuquerque, New Mexico
 Black Hill (disambiguation)
 Black Hills (disambiguation)
 Black Rock (disambiguation)
 , which has the same meaning in Slovak
 Černá Hora (disambiguation), which has the same meaning in Czech
 Crna Gora (disambiguation), which has the same meaning in Serbo-Croatian and Macedonian
 Mali i Zi (disambiguation), which has the same meaning in Albanian
 Kala Dhaka (Black Mountain of Hazara)
 Kara Dag (disambiguation), same in Turkic languages
 Montenegro (disambiguation), which has the same meaning in many Romance languages
 Mount Black, in Antarctica
 Mount Black (Tasmania)
 Qaradağlı (disambiguation), alternate Turkic form
 黑山 (disambiguation), alternate East Asian form
 Heishan (disambiguation)
 Czarna Góra (disambiguation)

zh:黑山